Francis Williams (September 20, 1910, McConnell's Mill, Pennsylvania - October 2, 1983, Houston, Texas) was an American jazz trumpeter.

Career
Williams's first gigs were with Frank Terry's Chicago Nightingales in the 1930s. In 1940 he moved to New York City, and in the first half of the decade played in the bands of Fats Waller, Claude Hopkins, Edgar Hayes, Ella Fitzgerald, Sabby Lewis, and Machito. From 1945 to 1949, and again in 1951, he played and recorded extensively as a member of Duke Ellington's orchestra.

Williams worked primarily with Latin jazz ensembles and New York theater bands in the 1950s and 1960s, and played with Clyde Bernhardt and the Harlem Blues and Jazz Band in addition to working with his own quartet. Near the end of his life he worked with Panama Francis.

Personal life
Williams was a single father and had one son, actor Greg Morris.

Death
Williams died on October 2, 1983 in Pennsylvania at the age of 73. He was survived by his son Greg Morris and his niece Florence Randolph.

References
Footnotes

General references
Eddie Lambert, "Francis Williams". The New Grove Dictionary of Jazz, ed. Barry Kernfeld, 1991, p. 1292.

American jazz trumpeters
American male trumpeters
Jazz musicians from Pennsylvania
1910 births
1983 deaths
20th-century trumpeters
20th-century American male musicians
American male jazz musicians
Harlem Blues and Jazz Band members
Savoy Sultans members